Macau, China participated at the 2018 Asian Games in Jakarta and Palembang, Indonesia, from 18 August to 2 September 2018. The country have prepared more than 120 athletes to compete in 16 event at the Games. Macau announced its team of 110 athletes and 56 officials, medical staff, team leaders, coaches, that will take part in 16 competitions: swimming, diving, artistic swimming, athletics, badminton, bowling, boxing, canoeing, cycling, fencing, golf, judo, karate, squash, table tennis, taekwondo, triathlon, and wushu.

Medalists

The following Macau competitors won medals at the Games.

|  style="text-align:left; width:78%; vertical-align:top;"|

|  style="text-align:left; width:22%; vertical-align:top;"|

Competitors 
The following is a list of the number of competitors representing Macau that participated at the Games:

Artistic swimming 

Macau entered 10 artistic swimmers to compete at the duet and team events at the Games.

FR: Reserved in free routine; RR: Reserved in technical and free routines; TR: Reserved in technical routine.

Athletics 

Macau athletics team dispatched 4 athletes to participate in the Asian Games which include 2 sprinters and 2 track and field contestants.

Badminton 

Macau have selected 2 male and 2 female badminton players to compete in the Asian Games.

Men

Women

Mixed

Bowling 

Macau competed in the bowling competition with 12 athletes (6 men's and 6 women's).

Men

Women

Boxing 

Ng Kuok Kun represented Macau in the boxing competition at the Games. Although Ng is a professional boxer and has had 13 professional fights, he was eligible to take part in the Asian Games alongside amateurs as he has not had 20 professional fights.

Men

Canoeing 

Macau competed in the canoeing sprint event with 3 athletes (1 men and 2 women's).

Sprint

Qualification legend: QF=Final; QS=Semifinal

Cycling 

Macau prepared 4 athletes for the cycling competition at the Games. Leong Chi Son did not participated in the race.

Road

Track

Omnium

Madison

Diving 

The diving team dispatched 2 male and 3 female athletes to participate in the eight events in the Games.

Men

Women

Fencing 

Macau entered 5 foil fencers (1 men and 4 women's) at the Games.

Individual

Team

Golf 

Macau entered six golfers (4 men's and 2 women's) who competed in the individual and team event. Several national golf associations complained to the Court of Arbitration for Sport that some of the Macau players was a professional golfers, but the CAS ruled that none of the players were professional.

Men

Women

Judo 

Macau put up 4 athletes (1 men and 3 women's) for Judo.

Men

Women

Karate 

Macau participated in the karate competition with 6 athletes (3 men's and 3 women's).

Squash 

Macau put up 3 squash players (1 men and 2 women's) including siblings Liu Tsun Man and Liu Kwai Chi at the Games.

Singles

Swimming

Macau entered 14 swimmers (7 men's and 7 women's) that participate in 37 events at the Games.

Men

Women

Mixed

Table tennis 

Macao Table Tennis Association have selected 10 table tennis players (5 men's and 5 women's) to compete at the Games.

Individual

Team

Taekwondo 

Macau settled 5 women's athletes in the taekwondo competition at the Games. Three taekwondo practitioners competed in the poomsae event, and 2 taekwondo practitioners in the kyorugi event.

Poomsae

Kyorugi

Triathlon 

Macau sent 5 triathletes (3 men's and 2 women's) at the Games.

Individual

Mixed relay

Wushu 

Macau have prepared 13 athletes for the wushu competition at the Games, and after the selection the team consists of 9 athletes (6 men's and 3 women's).

Taolu

Sanda

Key: * TV – Technical victory.

References

Nations at the 2018 Asian Games
2018
Asian Games